Since 1884, the Thirlwall Prize was instituted at Cambridge University in the memory of Bishop Connop Thirlwall, and has been awarded during odd-numbered years, for the best essay about British history or literature for a subject with original research. It was instituted on the condition that a foundation a medal is awarded in alternate years for the best dissertation involving original historical research, together with a sum of money to defray the expenses of publication. From 1885, the Prince Consort Prize was awarded in alternate years.

Winners 
Winners of the Thirlwall Prize include:

 1889  The Constitutional Experiments of the Commonwealth by E. Jenks
 1891  The Doctrine of Consideration in English Law by F. Aidan Hibbert
 1897  English Democratic Ideas in the Seventeenth Century by G.P. Gooch
 1905  The Second Athenian Confederacy by F.H. Marshall
 1907  Claudian as an Historical Authority by J. H. E. Crees
 1913  To Bartolus of Sassoferrato: his Position in the History of Medieval Political Thought by C. N. S. Woolf
 1917  The People's Faith in the Time of Wyclif by Bernard Lord Manning
 1923  Etruria and Rome by R. A. L. Fell
 1927  The Union of Moldavia and Wallachia, 1859 by William Gordon East
 1929  Scipio Africanus in the Second Punic War by Howard Hayes Scullard
 1931  Methodism & Politics, 1791-1851 by Ernest Richard Taylor
 1933  Aratos of Sicyon by F.W. Walbank
 1935  Senate and Provinces at the end of the Republic by J. Macdonald
 1937  The Theory of Religious Liberty in England, 1603-1639 by Thomas Lyon
 1939  Lord Liverpool and Liberal Toryism 1820-1827 by W. R. Brock
 1941  Bishop Reginald Pecock; a study in ecclesiastical history and thought by V. H. H. Green

See also

 List of history awards

References

Sources
 Endowments of the University of Cambridge, published in 1904, by John Willis Clark

External links
 Prince Consort and Thirlwall Prize and Fund: Notice, Statutes and Ordinances, 2008, pp. 716 and 857

Awards and prizes of the University of Cambridge
History awards
Awards established in 1884